In Kabardian, like all Northwest Caucasian languages, the verb is the most inflected part of speech. Verbs are typically head final and are conjugated for tense, person, number, etc. Some of Circassian verbs can be morphologically simple, some of them consist only of one morpheme, like: кӏуэ "go", щтэ "take". However, generally, Circassian verbs are characterized as structurally and semantically difficult entities. Morphological structure of a Circassian verb includes affixes (prefixes, suffixes) which are specific to the language. Verbs' affixes express meaning of subject, direct or indirect object, adverbial, singular or plural form, negative form, mood, direction, mutuality, compatibility and reflexivity, which, as a result, creates a complex verb, that consists of many morphemes and semantically expresses a sentence. For example: уакъыдэсогъэпсэлъэжы "I am forcing you to talk to them again" consists of the following morphemes: у-а-къы-дэ-со-гъэ-псэлъэ-жы, with the following meanings: "you (у) with them (а)  from there (къы) together (дэ) I (со) am forcing (гъэ) to speak (псэлъэн) again (жы)".

Transitivity
Verbs in Kabardian can be transitive or intransitive.

In a sentence with a transitive verb, nouns in the absolutive case (marked as -р) play the role of direct object. In the sentences of this type the noun in the subject's position is in the ergative case (marked as -м):

Щӏалэм письмор етх "The boy is writing the letter";
Пхъащӏэм уадэр къэщтащ "The carpenter took out the hammer";
Хьэм тхьакIумкӏыхьыр къиубыдащ "The dog has caught the hares".

In these sentences the verbs етх "is writing", къэщтащ "took out", къиубыдащ "has caught" are transitive verbs, and the nouns письмор "letter", уадэр "hammer", тхьакIумкӏыхьыр "hare" are in the absolutive case (suffix -р) and express direct object in the sentences, while the nouns щӏалэм "boy", пхъащӏэм "carpenter", хьэм "dog" are subjects expressed in the ergative case.

In a sentence with an intransitive verb, there is no direct object, and the real subject is usually expressed by a noun in the absolutive case.

Жэмахъуэр щыт "The shepherd is standing (there)";
Пэсакӏуэр макӏуэ "The security guard is going";
Лӏыр мэжей "The man is sleeping".

In these sentences with intransitive verbs, nouns that play role of subject are expressed in the absolutive case: жэмахъуэ-р "shepherd", пэсакӏуэ-р "guard", лӏы-р "man".

There are verbs in the Kabardian language that in different contexts and situations can be used both as transitive and intransitive. For example:

Абджыр мэкъутэ "The glass is being broken",
Щӏалэм абджыр екъутэ "The boy is breaking the glass".

In the first sentence the verb мэкъутэ "is being broken" is used as an intransitive verb that creates an absolutive construction. In the second sentence the verb е-къутэ "is breaking" creates an ergative construction. Both of the verbs are formed from the verb къутэ-н "to break".

In the Kabardian language, intransitive verbs can have indirect objects in a sentence. The indirect objects are expressed by a noun in the oblique case (which is also marked as -м). For example:

Щӏалэр пщащэм йоплъ "The boy looking at the girl",
Лӏыр жыгым щӏэлъ "The man lays under the tree".
Щӏалэр тхылъым йоджэ "The boy reads the book".

In these sentences with intransitive verbs, nouns that play role of indirect object are expressed in the oblique case: пщащэ-м  "girl", жыгы-м "tree", тхылъы-м "book".

Intransitive verbs can be turned into transitive with the causative affix -гъэ- (meaning "to force, to make"). For example:

Ар мажэ "He is running", but Абы ар е-гъа-жэ "He forces him to run",
Ар матхэ "He is writing", but Абы ар е-гъа-тхэ "He makes him to write".

The verbs in the first sentences мажэ "is running", матхэ "is writing"  are intransitive, and the verbs in the second sentences  егъажэ "forces ... to run", егъатхэ "makes ... to write" are already transitive.

Tense

Past
Type 1 :

The past tense of verbs of type 1 are formed by adding -aщ /-aːɕ/. In intransitive verbs it indicate that the action took place, but with no indication as to the duration, instant nor completeness of the action.

In transitive verbs it convey more specific information as regards to completeness of the action, and therefore they indicate some certainty as to the outcome of the action.

Type 2 :

This is the past perfect tense. It is formed by adding ~гъащ. It indicates that the action took place formerly at some certain time.

Type 3 :

Verbs of this group designate repetition of action in a vividly expressed
manner. They are formed by adding the suffix –т.

Сэ жысIэрт (I kept saying)
Дэ дылажьэрт (We worked repeatedly)
Ар еджэрт (He read many times)

Negative forms:

Сэ жысIэртэкъым (I did not kept saying)
Дэ дылажьэртэкъым (We did not work repeatedly)
Ар еджэртэкъым (He did not read many times)

Present
Intransitive verbs :

Transitive verbs :

Transitive verb examples :
Сэ адыгэбзэ грамматикэр содж (I study Circassian grammar)
Уэ адыгэбзэ грамматикэр уодж (You study Circassian grammar)
Абы адыгэбзэ грамматикэр едж (He/she studies Circassian grammar)
Дэ адыгэбзэ грамматикэр додж (We study Circassian grammar)
Фэ адыгэбзэ грамматикэр фодж (You (pl.) study Circassian grammar)
Абыхэм адыгэбзэ грамматикэр ядж or Адыгэбзэ грамматикэр яджхэр (They study Circassian grammar)

Intransitive poly-personal verb examples :
Сэ тхылъым соджэ (I read the book, I am reading the book)
Уэ тхылъым уоджэ (You read the book, you are reading the book)
Абы тхылъым йоджэ (He/she reads the book, he/she is reading the book)
Дэ тхылъым доджэ (We read the book, we are reading the book)
Фэ тхылъым фоджэ (You (pl.) read the book, you are reading the book)
Абыхэм тхылъым йоджэх (They read the book, they are reading the book)

Future
Indicating certainty :

Indicating some uncertainty :

Imperfect
The imperfect tense is formed with the additional suffix ~(р)т /~(r)t/ to the verb. It can have meanings similar to the English "was walking" or "used to walk". 

Examples:

Жаринэ дыгъуасэ сыхьэтыблым телевизорым еплът - Yesterday at seven o’clock Zarina was watching TV.
Япэрэм Руслан тутын ефэрт, иджыпсту ефэжкъым - Ruslan used to smoke before, but now he does not smoke any more.
Щӏалэм щилъэгъуам, ар уэшхэм хэту къафэрт - When the young-man saw her, she was dancing in the rain.’ (She can still be dancing.)
Сэ еджапӏэм сыкӏуэт, си телефоным укъыщеуэм - I was going to school when you called me.
Cищӏалэгъукӏэ тутын сефэт, итӏанэ спортым сыпыхьи сыщыужащ сефу - I used to smoke in my youth, afterward I started engaging in sports and stopped smoking.
Ар ипэкӏэ пщэдджыжыкӏэ фадэ ефэт - In earlier times he used to drink booze in the morning (but now he doesn’t have such a habit any more).

Pluperfect / Discontinuous past 
The tense ~ат /~aːt/ can be used for both past perfect (pluperfect) and discontinuous past:
 Past perfect: It indicates that the action took place formerly at some certain time, putting emphasis only on the fact that the action took place (not the duration)
 Past perfect 2: It expresses the idea that one action occurred before another action or event in the past. 
 Discontinuous past: It carries an implication that the result of the event described no longer holds. This tense expresses the following meanings: remote past, anti resultative (‘cancelled’ result), experiential and irrealis conditional.

Examples:

Зэ си адэм лъакъуэрыгъажэкӏэ къэзжыхьыну сыригъэсат - My father once taught me to ride a bicycle.

Урысыбзэ зэзмыгъэщӏэрэу, адыгэбзэ зэзгъэщӏат - Before I started studying the language of Russian, I had learnt Adyghe.
Сэ еджапӏэм сыкӏуат, уэ си унэм укъыщыӏухьэм - I had gone to school, when you arrived at my house.
Даринэ лэпсыр ищӏат Руслан унэм къыщехьэжым - When Ruslan came home, Darina had already cooked soup.

Си ӏункӏыбзэр ӏэнэм телъат - My keys were lying on the table (and now they are not there).
Щхьэгъубжэр хэт къызӏухатыр? - Who had opened the window? [Now it is closed.].
Дыкъыщыкӏуатэм си анэ полыр ипхъэнкӏытэмэ, унэм дыщигъэхьэнутэкъым - If my mother had been sweeping the floor at the moment when we had come, she would not have let us into the house.
Дыкъыщыкӏуатэм си анэ полыр ипхъэнкӏатэмэ, унэм дыщигъэхьэнутэкъым - If my mother had (already) swept the floor by the time we had come, she would not have let us into the house.

Future II Factual
The suffix ~нут /~nəwt/ applies to actions that may occur or stand contrary to factual certainty.

Examples:

Еджапӏэм сыкӏуатэмэ унэм сыщIэсынутэкъым - Had I gone to school, I would not be home.
Сэ къэсщэхунт, ауэ ахъшэ сиӏэкъым - I would buy, but I have no money.
Игъуэм укъэкӏуатэмэ, директорым ущIигъэхьэнт - If you had come on time the director would have let you in.
Ди сэнэхьатыр фӏы ямылъэгъуатэмэ, ахэр абы кӏуэнухэтэкъым - If they had not loved our profession, they would not have gone there.
Си анэ пщэдей къэкӏуэнутэмэ, сэ сыӏущӏэнут - If mother were to arrive tomorrow, I would have met her.
Дыгъуасэ си къуэщыр унэм щʼэсатэмэ, къыпхуэтеуэнут - If my brother had been at home yesterday he would have called you.

Morphology
The Kabardian language has an especially complex morphology. A verb by its set of morphemes can express subject's and object's person, place, time, manner of action, negative, and other types of grammatical categories. A verb can have some combinations of different affixes to describe specific verbs in different situations.

Verbal Prefixes

Causative (гъэ~)
The verbal suffix гъэ~ (ʁa~) designates causation; rendered by the verbs: to
force, compel, make; to order, tell; to allow, permit; to give the opportunity
to do something.; also forms transitive verbs; for example :
 псэлъэн: to talk → гъэпсэлъэн: to make (somebody.) talk.
 мэжэлІэн: to become hungry → гъэмэжэлІэн: to make (somebody.) go hungry.
 шхэн: to eat → гъэшхэн: to feed (somebody.)
 бзэхын: ещ disappear → гъэбзэхын: to hide/conceal (somebody., something.) quickly.

Directional

Directional (къэ~)
This preverb can be used with dynamic as well as static verbs. With this preverb, verbal stems are created which denote a motion to the speaker.
 кIуэн: to go → къэкIуэн: to come here
 жэн: to run → къэжэн: to run here
 тхэн: to write → къэтхэн: to write here
 хьын: to carry Y → къэхьын: to carry Y here
 джэн: to yell → къэджэн: to yell here

With dynamic verbs the preverb къэ- doesn't necessarily have a directional meaning.
 къэнэн: to remain at Y
 хъун: to happen; to grow → къэхъун: to happen; to grow
 укIын: to kill Y (an animal) → къэукIын: to kill Y (an animal)
 къэпцIэн: to lie about Y
 лъытэн: to take into account Y → къэлъытэн: to take into account Y

It can also result into verbs with a more resultative meaning.
 гупсысэн : to think → къэгупсысын: to come up with Y
 псэлъэн: to talk → къэпсэлъэн: to pronounce Y
 вэн: to boil → къэвэн: to boil
 губжьын: to be angry → къэгубжьын: to get angry

The verbal prefix къэ~ designates arrival, approach, movement directed to the speaker; for example :
 мафӏэгур къэсащ: the train has arrived.

It also designates approach of some season, time; for example :
 щӏымахуэр къэсащ: winter has arrived.

It also adds a tinge of definiteness to the verb; for example :
 къэпсэлъэн: to deliver a speech; to begin to speak.

Direction of motion (нэ~)
The verbal prefix нэ~ (ны~) designates direction of motion from speaker to second person; for example :
 ар уи деж нэкӏуащ: he went to you.
 ар уи деж ныщӏыхьащ: he went to visit you.

It also forms verbs that convey a sense of completion of an action; for example :
 нэдысын: to finish (sewing); нэвысын: to finish ploughing/tilling.
 нэджысын: to finish (reading), to read to the end.

Inside (и-)
The verbal prefix и~ (jə~) designates movement or position inside something.

 бытулъкIэм илъын: to lie inside a bottle

It can denote motion downward and inward:
 игуэн: to push Y into Z

It can denote being inside:
 вагоным исын: to sit inside a wagon

It can denote removal from something:
 игъэхун: to drop Y out of Z (e.g. a pocket)
 пэгуным псыр ижащ: water flowed out of the bucket
 игъэщIеикIын: to deflect Y backwards

Within (хэ-)
The verbal prefix хэ~ (xa~) designates movement or position inside something.
 мазым хэсын: to be inside a forest

It can denote being somewhere in some sort mass, in an abstract and practical way:
 псым хэтын: to stand in water
 хасэм хэтын: to stand/be in the Khase
 академием хэтын: to stand/be in the academy

It can denote motion towards a mass:
 тхакIуэхэм я союзым хыхьэн: to join a writers' union
 артистхэм хыхьэн: to join the artists (the ranks of artists)

Among (дэ-)
The verbal prefix дэ~ (da~) designates movement or position inside something.
 къалэм дыхьэн: to be in the city

It can denote the presence in a certain territory or landscape:
 машинэр уэрамым дэтщ: the car is on the street
 пщIантIэм дэтын: to be in the yard

It can denote motion towards a certain territory or landscape:
 пхъэр пщIантIэм дэшэн: bring wood into the yard

It can denote motion from a certain territory or landscape:
 щхьэгъубжэм дэплъын: to look out of the window

Bypass (блэ~)
The verbal suffix блэ~ (bɮa~) designates movement bypass somebody or something; for example : 
 унэм блэжын: to run by/past the house.

Through (пхы~)
The verbal prefix пхы~ (пхыры~) designates action, motion directed through some obstacle, object; ex.: * пхырыжын: to run through smth.;
 шэр nхъэбгъум пхыкІащ: the bullet went through the board;
 пхивыкІын: to get wet/soaked through.

Across (пыры~)
The verbal prefix пыры~ designates action of transference over object that is of comparatively small height; ex.:
 жыхьым пырыплъын: to look over the fence

It also designates action, motion directed across some obstacle; ex.:
 псым пырышын (е зэпырышын): to take/lead across the river;
 лъэмыжым пырышын: to take/lead across the bridge

After (кӏэлъ~)
The verbal prefix кӏэлъ~ (tʃʼaɬ) indicates action that happened towards after something or somebody; for example.:
 мыщэм кІэлъыкIуэн: to go after the bear;
 кІэлъежьэн: to set off/ out after, to start after, to leave after (smb., smth.);
 кІэлъесын: to swim after (smb., smth.).
 кІэлъытхэн: to write after (smb., smth.).
 кІэлъыжэн: to run after (smb., smth.).
 кIэлъыхьын: to carry after (smb., smth.).
 кIэлъыдзын: to throw after (smb., smth.).

Comitative (дэ~)
The verbal suffix дэ~ (da~) designates action performed jointly with somebody.
 шхэн: to eat → дэшхэн: to eat with somebody.
 кӏуэн : to go → дэкӏуэн : to go with somebody.

Reciprocal (зэ~)
The verbal prefix зэ~ is used in formation of reciprocal verbs; for example :
 зэзэуэн: to fight each other.

зэдэ~ is used in formation of reciprocal verbs; for example :
 зэдэгушыIэн: to joke with one another.

Reflexive (з~)
The verbal prefix з~ designates reflexive action; for example :
 зылъэщІын: to wipe oneself.
 зыплъыхьын: to look about oneself.
 зэгъэжьэн: to force oneself to wait;
 зэлъэфэлӏэн: to drag to oneself.

Destination (здэ~)
The verbal suffix здэ~ designates destination of action; for example :
 сыздэкIуэнур сощӏэ: I know where I am going to.

Involuntative (ӏэщӏэ~)
The verbal prefix ӏэщӏэ~ (ʔaɕʼa~) designates an action which was done unintentionally. for example :

 хьэм бaжэр ӏэщӏэтхьэлыхьaщ - "The dog slaughtered the fox (unintentionally)"
 хьэр бaжэм ӏэщӏэтхьэлыхьaщ - "The fox (unintentionally) slaughtered the dog"
 щIaлэм дыгъур ӏэщӏэyкӏaщ - "The young man (unintentionally) killed the thief"
 yэ yсӏэщӏэyкӏaщ - "I accidentally killed you"
 щӏaлэм лӏыжьым дыгъур ӏэщӏигъэyкӏaщ - "The boy made the old man accidentally kill the thief"

Against (фӏэ~)
The verbal prefix фӏэ~ (фӏы~) designates action done against somebody's will or interest. This verbal prefix can also be used indicate that the action was done to take an object or an opportunity away from somebody else.; for example :
 кӏуэн: to go → фӏэкӏуэн: to go against somebody's wish.

Benefactive (ху~)
The verbal prefix хуэ~ (xʷa~) designates action performed to please somebody, for somebody's sake, in somebody's interests; for example :
 анэм ӏуэху хуэщІэн: to do work for one's mother

Verbal Infixes

Negative (~мы~)
~мы~ negatory infix; for example :
 жыӏэ: say → жумыӏэ: do not say.
 къакӏуэ: come → укъэмыкӏуэ: do not come.

Verbal Suffixes

Directional Suffixes
Directional suffixes denote a certain directionality. They usually can only be attached in combination with directional preverbs.

Upwards (~и)
The verbal suffix ~и  designates action in an upward direction or against a flow. It is used in combination with the preverb дэ-.

Examples:

 кIуэн: to go -> дэкІуеин: to go upwards.
 лъэн: to jump -> дэлъеин: to jump/leap up.

Downwards (~хы)
The verbal suffix ~х designates downward direction of action. It is always used with the preverb е-. The resulting verb is always dynamic.

Verbs are divided into groups depending on how this suffix interacts with ablaut alteration.

One group alternates, the other doesn't.

Group 1:
 лъэфын: to decorate Y → елъэфэхын: to decorate Y from up to down
 лъэн: to jump → елъыхын: to jump down

Group :
 шэн: to lead Y → ешэхын: to lead Y down
 щIын: to do/build Y → ещIыхын: to build Y from up to down

Examples:
 ежэхын: to roll down; to run down.
 джабэм ежэхын: to roll down the mountain's slope.
 псыр джабэм хуабжьу йожэх: the river is streaming down the mountain' slope.
 ехьэхын: to lower, sink somebody or something.
 щхьэр ехьэхын: to hang one's head.
 рабочэхэр шахтэм ехьэхын: to get the workers down to the mine.

Directed towards (~лӏ)
The verbal suffix ~лӏ  designates action directed towards, or applied to smb., smth.; ex.:
 ежэлІэн: vi to run up (to smb., smth.), to come running up (to smb., smth.);
 ехьэлІэн: vt 1. to take, carry (smb., smth. to smb., smth.);
 хьэпшыпхэр автобусым ~: to carry the articles to the bus.
 къекIуэлIащ: he appeared; he presented himself.

Around (~хь)
The verbal suffix ~хь designates action performed on a definite location or repetition of the action;
 къэжыхьын: to run about;
 къэкIухьын: to go/walk about;

It also designates movement round an object :
 Іуащхьэм къэкIухьын: to walk/go round the hill;
 жыгым къэкIухьын: to walk/go round the tree.

Completion (~гъах)
The verbal suffix ~гъэхэ designates absolute accomplishment/realization of the action; for example :
 кӏуагъэхэщ: he's already gone.

Frequentative (~ж)
The verbal suffix ~ж designates recurrence/repetition of action; for example :
 къэсын: to arrive → къэсыжын: to arrive again.
 къэшэн: to bring → къэшэжын: to bring again.

Connective (~и)
~и (connective suffix) and, also; for example :
 къакӏуи еплъ: come and have a look.

Negative (~къым)
~къым (verbal suffix) negatory suffix; for example :
 хьэщӏэр иджыри къэс къэсакъым: the guest hasn't arrived yet.
 сэ еджапӏэм сыкӏуакъым: I didn't go to school.

Conditional mood (~мэ)
The conditional suffix is indicated by ~м(э); for example :
 ар къакIуэмэ, сэ бэзэрым сыкIуэнущ: If he comes, I will go to the market.

Concessive mood (~ми)
The verbal suffix ~ми designates concessive mood; for example :
 укIуами: even if you had gone.

Infinitive (~н)
~н infinitive forming suffix; for example :
 тхэн: to write.
 кIуэн: to go.

Recurrence (~рей)
The verbal suffix ~рей (~raj) designates recurrence, presence of a characteristic; for example :
 мэпсэлъэрей: he is fond of talking; he is garrulous.
 мэдауэрей: he is given to brawling; he is a brawler.

Repetition (~рт)
The verbal suffix ~рт designates repetition/recurrence of action; ex.:
 тхэрт: he wrote repeatedly.

Imperative mood (~т)
The verbal suffix ~т designates the imperative mood; for example :
 жыӏэт: do say; just say.
 тхэт: just write.

Subjunctive mood (~тэмэ)
The verbal suffix ~тэмэ designates subjunctive mood; for example :
  укӏуатэмэ: if you had gone.

Concessive mood (~тэми)
The verbal suffix ~тэми designates concessive mood; for example :
 укӏуатэми: even if you had gone.

Capability (~фы)
The verbal suffix ~ф designates the ability to perform the indicated action; for example :
 жыӏэфын: to be able to speak/talk; to speak eloquently/articulately;to manage to say (something.)
 хьыфын: to manage, be able, to take/carry (away) (something. somewhere.).

Completeness (~пэ)
The verbal suffix ~пэ designates completeness and fulfilment of the action; ex.:
 илэжьыпащ: accomplished, realized, carried into effect;
 шхыпэн: vt to eat (up) (smth.) entirely.

Absolute completeness (~кӏэ)
The verbal suffix ~кӏэ designates absolute completeness of action; ex.:
 сщIакIэщ: I have already done it.

Slight excessiveness (~ӏуэ)
The verbal suffix ~ӏуэ designates slight excessiveness; ex.:
 тхэӏуэн: to write more than is necessary.

Excessiveness (~къуэ)
The verbal suffix ~къуэ  designates excessiveness; ex.:
 псэлъэкъуэн: to out-talk somebody; to talk too much; to have a long talk with somebody, to get carried away by a conversation with somebody.

Plural (~хэ)
The pluralizing suffix is indicated by ~хэ; for example :
 къэкIуахэщ: they came.

Preliminary condition (~хэ)
The verbal suffix ~хэ designates preliminary condition; for example :
 зытхьэщIыхэн: wash yourself first.
 зытхьэщIыхи шхэ: first wash yourself, and then eat.

Absolute negation (~ххэ)
~ххэ (verbal suffix) designates absolute negation; for example :
 сыкIуэххэнкъым: I will definitely not go.

Optative mood (~щэрэ)
The verbal suffix ~щэрэ (~щэрэт) designates optative mood; ex.:
 Налшык сыкIуащэрэ: if only I could go to Nalchik; I wish I could go to Nalchik.

References

Bibliography
 Kabardian Verbal Affixes; collected, arranged and edited by Amjad Jaimoukha.

Kabardian language
Verbs by language